The Ghana Planetarium is located behind the Ghana Police Headquarters in Cantonments, Accra. It is open throughout the year.

The planetarium of Accra was founded by Dr. Jacob and Jane Ashong and was constructed from their pension in 2009. It was officially opened on Thursday January 22, 2009 by the British High Commissioner, Nicholas Westcott. Also attending were The British Council Director, The French Ambassador and the Chief of Nungua and his entourage.

References

Planetaria
Accra